Robert Machray Ward (born May 4, 1945) is an American stage and television actor. He is known for playing fire marshal "Captain Dobbins" in the American sitcom television series Cheers.

Life and career 
Machray was born in San Diego, California. He worked as a flower seller, with also working as a person dressing up as Santa Claus in taverns. Machray performed on stage for which Machray was a shakespearean actor, in which he appeared on numerous shakespeare festivals. He performed at numerous stage productions for which his role were preferred as major, appearing in companies such as the Los Angeles Civic Light Opera, Hartford Stage and Playwrights Horizons, among others. Machray began his film and television career in 1977, where he appeared in the television film Panic in Echo Park. He then appeared in the sitcom television series Operation Petticoat.

Machray guest-starred in television programs including Roseanne, Life Goes On, The Drew Carey Show, Suddenly Susan, Profiler and Three's Company. He also appeared in two films: Cutting Class (as Mr. Conklin) and The Master of Disguise. In 1983, Machray was cast in a summer stage production, titled, My Fair Lady. In 1991, he appeared in a stage play called A Passenger Train of Sixty-One Coaches, in which according to the Lexington Herald-Leader, Joe Marks who played Sidney Reidlitch had glanced and resonated like Machray for which he was described as personified. Machray retired his career in 2011, last apppearing in the political satire mockumentary sitcom television series Parks and Recreation.

References

External links 

Rotten Tomatoes profile

1945 births
Living people
People from San Diego
Male actors from California
American male stage actors
American male television actors
American male Shakespearean actors
20th-century American male actors
21st-century American male actors